Darkness is the third in an extended play series The Wonderlands by Jon Foreman. lowercase people records released the EP on September 4, 2015. The EP was a collaborative effort amongst many producers and mixed by Future of Forestry's Eric Owyoung. The series is a collaborative effort, with a different producer for each song, and Foreman sending in tracks recorded backstage while on tour.

Critical reception

Kevin Sparkman, giving the EP four and a half stars for CCM Magazine, states, "Despite its name, this short set doesn't play like a musical dirge, rather keeping The Wonderlands tradition alive with sonically diverse sensations and ongoing brilliance." Awarding the EP four and a half stars at New Release Today, Mary Nikkel states, "Musically, this project is equally strong." In an eight out of ten review for Cross Rhythms, Helen Whitall criticizes several tracks, which she writes "slightly diminishes what is otherwise another stunning release."

Joshua Andre, rating the EP four and a half stars from 365 Days of Inspiring Media, writes, "If you thought that Sunlight and Shadows were both epic, then Darkness continues on that trend." Signaling in a three and a half star review by Jesus Freak Hideout, Jeremy Barnes replies, "Darkness may be the weakest of The Wonderlands releases for reasons unrelated to individual songwriting." Dylan O'Conner, indicating in a four star review at Jesus Freak Hideout, responds, "Darkness is an engaging experience that draws us closer to the finale of the Wonderlands saga."

Track listing

Chart performance

References

2015 EPs
Jon Foreman albums